Ilgar Saadi oglu Ismailov (29 March 1959, Baku, Azerbaijan SSR – 1 October 1992) was a National Hero of Azerbaijan and warrior during the First Nagorno-Karabakh War.

Early life and education 
Ismailov was born on 29 March 1959 in Baku, Azerbaijan SSR.  In 1966, he went to the Secondary School No. 45 in Baku and in 1976 he completed his education. Then, he was admitted to Azerbaijan Physical Training Institute. From 1981 through 1983, Ismailov served in the Soviet Armed Forces.

Ismailov was married and had two children.

First Nagorno-Karabakh War 
When Armenians attacked the territories of Azerbaijan, Ismailov voluntarily went to the front-line. Under his leadership, 128 Azerbaijani warriors released Qizarti heights from Armenian armed troops. He was killed in a battle by Armenian soldiers on 1 October 1992.

Honors 
Ilgar Saadi oglu Ismailov was posthumously awarded the title of the "National Hero of Azerbaijan" under Presidential Decree No. 273 dated 19 October 1992. Ismailov was buried at a Martyrs' Lane cemetery in Baku.

One of the street in Baku was named after him.

See also 
 First Nagorno-Karabakh War
 List of National Heroes of Azerbaijan

References

Further reading 
Vüqar Əsgərov. Azərbaycanın Milli Qəhrəmanları (kitab)|"Azərbaycanın Milli Qəhrəmanları" (Yenidən işlənmiş II nəşr). Bakı: "Dərələyəz-M", 2010, səh. 144.

1959 births
1992 deaths
Military personnel from Baku
Azerbaijani military personnel of the Nagorno-Karabakh War
Azerbaijani military personnel killed in action
National Heroes of Azerbaijan